Nevermore is a historical mystery novel by William Hjortsberg.

Plot summary
Harry Houdini joins forces with Arthur Conan Doyle to solve a series of murders, which eerily re-enact the stories of Edgar Allan Poe.

Reception
Publishers Weekly considered it "droll and captivating", with "stellar characters and (an) outlandish plot". The Los Angeles Times noted Hjortsberg's "obvious delight in historical detail,; similarly, the New York Times observed that Hjorstberg "was obviously out to have a good time" in writing the novel, concluding that as a result, readers would similarly enjoy it.

References

1995 American novels
American mystery novels
Works of Edgar Allan Poe in popular culture
Cultural depictions of Arthur Conan Doyle
Cultural depictions of Harry Houdini